Renato Piccolo (born 31 December 1962) is an Italian former professional cyclist. He is best known for leading the Mountains classification of the 1988 Giro d'Italia for over ten stages, but finishing third overall at the Giro's conclusion. He also competed in the individual road race event at the 1984 Summer Olympics.

References

1962 births
Living people
Italian male cyclists
Cyclists from the Metropolitan City of Venice
People from Portogruaro
Cyclists at the 1984 Summer Olympics
Olympic cyclists of Italy